Masanori "Mashi" Murakami (村上 雅則, Murakami Masanori, born May 6, 1944) is a retired Japanese baseball player. He is notable for being the first Japanese player to play for a Major League Baseball team. In , he struck out over one batter per inning pitched, posted an ERA under 4 and earned eight saves. Following this season, however, Murakami headed back to his original Japanese club due to contractual obligations, where his success continued for another 17 years.

Biography

Murakami entered the Japanese Pacific League professional team, the Nankai Hawks, in September , while still attending high school. In 1964, his team sent him, along with two other young players, to the San Francisco Giants single-A team Fresno as a baseball "exchange student". He was originally only scheduled to stay in the United States until June, but the Hawks neglected to call him back to Japan, and he stayed with the Giants for the rest of the season. In August of the same year, he was promoted to the majors, and on September 1, 1964, he became the first Japanese player to play in the major leagues and the first Asian-born player since Chinese-born Harry Kingman's cup of coffee 50 years earlier. He entered the ninth inning against the New York Mets and pitched to four batters, striking out two and allowing just one hit and zero runs. He pitched the final three innings of an 11-inning 5-4 win by the Giants on September 29 over the Houston Colt .45s to get his first career win. In nine games with the Giants, he pitched a total of 15 innings while allowing eight hits and three runs (with all of the runs occurring in his final game on October 4) while having 15 strikeouts and one walk for a 1.80 ERA. Murakami's performance caused the Giants to refuse the Hawks' order to return him to Japan. The argument escalated during the 1964 off-season, and Japanese baseball commissioner Yushi Uchimura was called in to make the final decision on which team Murakami would play with. The commissioner made a compromise; Murakami would return to the Hawks after he had played for another full season with the Giants. He wore number 10 with the San Francisco Giants. He appeared in 45 games, pitching a total of 74 1⁄3 innings while going 4-1 with a 3.75 ERA, 85 strikeouts and 22 walks.

He did not pitch well, and the Tigers released him after one year, but the Nippon Ham Fighters picked him up. He was not signed as a player, but became a batting practice pitcher for Giants' home games.

He also served as a pitching coach for the Fukuoka Daiei Hawks and Seibu Lions. He also briefly worked as a scout for the San Francisco Giants, and is now a commentator for NHK major league baseball games, and writes for the Daily Sports newspaper.

In , Murakami was presented with the Foreign Minister's Certificate of Commendation in commemoration of the 150th anniversary of the Japan-US relationship by the Ministry of Foreign Affairs of Japan.

Murakami was honored by the San Francisco Giants at AT&T Park on Friday, May 16, 2008, when a limited edition Murakami bobblehead was given away at the evening game against the Chicago White Sox as part of the team's "Japanese Heritage Night" promotion. He was again honored on the 50th anniversary of his debut on Friday, May 15, 2014 during the team's "Japanese Heritage Night" promotion and game attendees were given a figurine-style bust of Murakami, and threw out the first pitch of the game.

Pitching style
Murakami was not an overpowering pitcher. His fastball was only in the low to mid 80 mph range, even during his prime. His best pitch was a sharp screwball, which he learned in the majors, and he also threw a good changeup and curve. He was a valuable reliever, being a left-hander throwing from the sidearm. His total record in two years in the majors was 5–1, 9 saves, with a 3.43 ERA in 54 games.

Language skills
Murakami could barely speak or understand English when he first came to the United States, and always had a dictionary on hand to communicate with teammates. When promoted to the majors, he was told to go to New York City (where the San Francisco Giants were playing), and was given his plane ticket on the spot. In New York, he signed a major league contract even though he could not read a single word written on the contract.

The authors of 1973's semi-satirical reference, The Great American Baseball Card Flipping, Trading and Bubble Gum Book, stated that Murakami was "with the possible exception of Yogi Berra, the only major league ballplayer who did not speak English."

After retirement, he became a TV commentator for NHK television.  He spent over a decade as a founding board member for the Special Olympics Japan promoting understanding about people with mental disabilities in Japan.  He served as an advisor to the U.N. High Commissioner for Refugees in Japan and organized an annual golf charity competition that raises funds for good causes, including for victims  the 9/11 terrorist attack. He promoted diversity by serving as the manager of Japan's national women's baseball team.� Source: Speech by Masanori Murakami on April 22, 2008 at the �American Chamber of Commerce in Japan.

Notes

External links

, Alexander Kleinberg, MLB.com, 24 December 2001.
Japanese league stats and info of Masanori Murakami

1944 births
Fresno Giants players
Hanshin Tigers players
Japanese expatriate baseball players in the United States
Living people
Major League Baseball pitchers
Major League Baseball players from Japan
Nankai Hawks players
Nippon Ham Fighters players
People from Ōtsuki, Yamanashi
Baseball people from Yamanashi Prefecture
San Francisco Giants players
Fellows of the American Physical Society